Cerconota certiorata is a moth in the family Depressariidae. It was described by Edward Meyrick in 1932. It is found in Brazil (Santa Catharina).

References

Moths described in 1932
Cerconota
Taxa named by Edward Meyrick